Oakland Library may refer to:

Oakland Public Library, in Oakland, California
African American Museum and Library at Oakland, in Oakland, California
Oakland Public Library, in Oakland, Maine
Oakland Library, a branch of the Lee County Library in Georgia